Midway is an unincorporated community in King William County, Virginia, United States.

There was a locally renowned country store here that burned down in the mid-1990s. Nothing stands there today.

References

Unincorporated communities in Virginia
Unincorporated communities in King William County, Virginia